The Tales series, known in Japan as the , is a franchise of fantasy Japanese role-playing video games published by Bandai Namco Games (formerly Namco), and developed by its subsidiary, Namco Tales Studio (formerly Wolf Team) until 2011 and presently by Bandai Namco. First begun in 1995 with the development and release of Tales of Phantasia for the Super Famicom, the series currently spans fifteen main titles, multiple spin-off games and supplementary media in the form of manga series, anime series, and audio dramas.

While entries in the series generally stand independent of each other with different characters and stories, they are commonly linked by their gameplay, themes and high fantasy settings. Most of the main Tales games have been localized for North America and Europe, although almost all of the spinoff titles have not been released abroad. While generally seen as a niche series in English speaking regions, Tales is considered a high-profile property in Japan, just behind other series such as Final Fantasy and Dragon Quest. As of December 2013, the series has sold 16 million units worldwide.

Video games
In 2007, series producer Makoto Yoshizumi defined two classes of Tales games, "Mothership Titles" and "Escort Titles". "Mothership" essentially means "Main series", where as "Escort" essentially means "Spinoff". The games are also frequently given what is called a "Characteristic Genre Name", which is a short subtitle or phrase that outlines the game's overall theme. There are also terms that are used in remakes or ports of games: "R" stands for "remake" or "re-imagination" (as in Hearts R), while "F" in Graces F stands for "future", in reference to the game's extra story content.

Mothership titles

Escort titles

Tales of the World, Narikiri Dungeon, Radiant Mythology 
Games that are a part of the Tales of the World, Narikiri Dungeon, and/or Radiant Mythology series.

Original
Basically independent of other titles, titles with original worlds and characters are organized here.

Compilations

Spin-off Sequels
Games that are sequels to mothership titles, but are not considered to be one themselves, and are not a part of the Tales of the World, Narikiri Dungeon, or Radiant Mythology series.

Non-RPG Spin-off
Games that are not of the role-playing game genre but features characters and settings from the Tales series.

Fan Disk

Online

Tales of Mobile

Spin-offs
Games that are not from the mothership nor escort titles, but are considered to have similar gameplay from the two.

Other media

Anime

Radio

References

External links
Official website

Production I.G

Tales
Tales